Peterson Creek is a river in the Lake Ontario and Cataraqui River drainage basins in South Frontenac, Frontenac County and Rideau Lakes, Leeds and Grenville United Counties in eastern Ontario, Canada. It flows  from Upper Peterson Lake to its mouth at Hart Lake.

Course
It flows northeast through Lower Peterson Lake to Gamble Bay on Crow Lake. The creek continues northeast through the lake into Rideau Lakes township and exits the lake at the north end at Ormonds Bay. Hart Lake drains through two outlets, each of which eventually empty into the Cataraqui River, which flows to Lake Ontario at the city of Kingston.

See also
List of rivers of Ontario

References

Rivers of Frontenac County
Rivers of Leeds and Grenville United Counties